See Ricci calculus and Van der Waerden notation for the notation.

In quantum field theory, the nonlinear Dirac equation is a model of self-interacting Dirac fermions. This model is widely considered in quantum physics as a toy model of self-interacting electrons.

The nonlinear Dirac equation appears in the Einstein–Cartan–Sciama–Kibble theory of gravity, which extends general relativity to matter with intrinsic angular momentum (spin).  This theory removes a constraint of the symmetry of the affine connection and treats its antisymmetric part, the torsion tensor, as a variable in varying the action.  In the resulting field equations, the torsion tensor is a homogeneous, linear function of the spin tensor.  The minimal coupling between torsion and Dirac spinors thus generates an axial-axial, spin–spin interaction in fermionic matter, which becomes significant only at extremely high densities.  Consequently, the Dirac equation becomes nonlinear (cubic) in the spinor field, which causes fermions to be spatially extended and may remove the ultraviolet divergence in quantum field theory.

Models

Two common examples are the massive Thirring model and the Soler model.

Thirring model
The Thirring model was originally formulated as a model in (1 + 1) space-time dimensions and is characterized by the Lagrangian density

where  is the spinor field,  is the Dirac adjoint spinor,

Soler model

The Soler model was originally formulated in (3 + 1) space-time dimensions. It is characterized by the Lagrangian density

using the same notations above, except

is now the four-gradient operator contracted with the four-dimensional Dirac gamma matrices , so therein .

Other models

Besides the Soler model, extensive work has been done where nonlinear versions of Dirac’s equation are used to describe purely classical, nonlinear particle-like solutions (PLS) in (3 + 1) space-time dimensions. Rañada has given a review of the subject.  Although a more recent review specifically devoted to purely classical, nonlinear PLS has apparently not appeared, pertinent references are available in various more recent publications.

The models reviewed by Rañada are meant to be entirely classical in nature and should properly be regarded as having nothing to do with quantum mechanics, but the dependent variable in the Dirac equation is still typically taken as a spinor.  When a purely classical model of this nature is to be considered, the use of a spinor as the dependent variable seems inappropriate.

If a minor modification of the underlying Dirac equation is used, the problem can be avoided in a relatively straightforward way.  Instead of using the usual column vector as the dependent variable in Dirac’s equation, one can use a 4 x 4 matrix.  When there is no transformation of coordinates, the leftmost column of the matrix is used in Dirac’s equation in the usual manner, but when there is to be a transformation in space-time, the four components of the dependent variable are sometimes allowed to appear in various different positions in the 4 x 4 matrix.

The result can be understood in terms of a Clifford algebra since the dependent variable in Dirac’s equation can be represented as a 4 dimensional left ideal of a Clifford algebra.  In this case one simply allows the dependent variable to lie in a different left ideal when there is a transformation in space-time.

Einstein–Cartan theory

In Einstein–Cartan theory the Lagrangian density for a Dirac spinor field is given by 

where

is the Fock–Ivanenko covariant derivative of a spinor with respect to the affine connection,  is the spin connection,  is the determinant of the metric tensor , and the Dirac matrices satisfy

The Einstein–Cartan field equations for the spin connection yield an algebraic constraint between the spin connection and the spinor field rather than a partial differential equation, which allows the spin connection to be explicitly eliminated from the theory. The final result is a nonlinear Dirac equation containing an effective "spin-spin" self-interaction,

See also
 Dirac equation
 Dirac equation in the algebra of physical space
 Dirac–Kähler equation
 Gross–Neveu model
 Higher-dimensional gamma matrices
 Nonlinear Schrödinger equation
 Pokhozhaev's identity for the stationary nonlinear Dirac equation
 Soler model
 Thirring model

References

Quantum field theory
Dirac equation